Daniel Andre Sturridge (born 1 September 1989) is an English professional footballer who plays as a striker. As well as representing England, he has played in the Premier League for Manchester City, Chelsea, Bolton Wanderers, Liverpool and West Bromwich Albion, and he has also played for Turkish Süper Lig club Trabzonspor as well as Australian football club Perth Glory.

Sturridge spent four years in the Aston Villa academy before moving to Coventry City. He then signed for Manchester City in 2003. He continued his development at City and played in two FA Youth Cup finals. He made his first-team debut in the 2007–08 season, becoming the only player ever to score in the FA Youth Cup, FA Cup and Premier League in the same season. He left City in 2009 and signed for Chelsea, where he was loaned out to Bolton Wanderers for the second half of the 2010–11 season. After a successful spell at Bolton, scoring eight goals in 12 appearances, he returned to Chelsea for the 2011–12 season.

He left Chelsea to join Liverpool in January 2013, where he formed an attacking partnership with Luis Suárez dubbed 'SAS'. Liverpool scored more than 100 league goals in the 2013–14 season with Sturridge scoring 21 goals, behind only Suárez with 31. The following two seasons were curtailed by myriad injuries, limiting him to very few appearances. He scored the opening goal in the 2016 Europa League final, although Liverpool eventually lost the game to Sevilla. He featured most often as a substitute in the next seasons under manager Jürgen Klopp, but was part of the UEFA Champions League-winning squad in 2019. He subsequently had spells with Turkish Süper Lig club Trabzonspor and Australian A-League club Perth Glory.

Sturridge has represented England at all levels. He made 15 appearances and scored four goals for the under-21 team. He made his debut for England against Sweden on 15 November 2011 and was selected for the 2012 Summer Olympics, the 2014 FIFA World Cup and UEFA Euro 2016.

Club career

Youth career

Born in Birmingham, West Midlands, Sturridge began his playing career at the age of six at local club Cadbury Athletic, before being spotted at the age of seven by the youth academy of Aston Villa. He left Villa four years later to move to Coventry City, from where he joined Manchester City's Academy in 2003, aged 13. A Football League committee later ordered Manchester City to pay Coventry £30,000 compensation, with further payments up to a maximum of £200,000 based upon appearances and international honours. The following year, he was the leading scorer and voted player of the tournament (the only other person to achieve this was Argentine footballer Carlos Tevez) as City won the Nike Cup, the world's largest under-15 tournament. At 16, he played for Manchester City Youth during their 2006 FA Youth Cup run. The youngest player in the team, he scored four goals en route to the final, and another two in the final, though they were insufficient to prevent a 3–2 aggregate defeat to Liverpool. That summer, he signed his first professional contract, which came into effect when he turned 17.

Manchester City
From the start of the 2006–07 season, Sturridge began to train with the City first team. A hat-trick in a reserve match was rewarded by a place on the substitutes' bench for the senior team's match with Reading in February 2007. He duly made his debut from the bench, replacing Georgios Samaras for the final quarter-hour. He made a second substitute appearance a month later, but then suffered a hip injury which sidelined him for the remainder of 2007.

Sturridge scored his first goal for City on 27 January 2008 in an FA Cup match against Sheffield United, followed three days later by his first league goal on his full debut, against Derby County. However, first-team opportunities were quite sporadic, so Sturridge continued to play for the youth team in the FA Youth Cup. City again reached the final, with Sturridge the leading scorer in the competition. This time City won the final, with Sturridge scoring in the first leg. In the 2007–08 season, Sturridge became the only player ever to score in the Youth FA Cup, the FA Cup and the Premier League in the same season.

Sturridge contributed in the 2008–09 season with 26 appearances and scoring 4 goals. On 28 December 2008, in a league match against Blackburn Rovers, City were trailing 2–0. Coming on as a 71st-minute substitute, Sturridge scored in the 88th minute of the match taking advantage of a header by André Ooijer. He also went on to assist Robinho's injury time goal. Manager Mark Hughes said that Sturridge was a player with great potential and had an impact in the game. He also praised his assist, saying "he picked out Robinho for the equaliser in an area where we had been struggling to find him". At the end of the season, he was voted as the club's Young Player of the Year.

Chelsea

With Sturridge's contract at Manchester City expired, he signed for Chelsea on a four-year contract on 3 July 2009. As Sturridge was under the age of 24, and the two clubs were unable to agree a deal, the fee for Sturridge was decided by a tribunal. The Professional Football Compensation Committee decided on 14 January 2010 that Chelsea would pay an initial fee of £3.5 million, with additional payments of £500,000 after each of 10, 20, 30 and 40 appearances. There would also be a further payment of £1 million if Sturridge made a full international appearance, and Manchester City in addition would receive 15 percent of any sell-on fee if Sturridge was transferred, after these add ons the fee for the player reached an eventual fee of £8.3m.

2009–10 season
Sturridge made his Premier League debut for Chelsea on 18 August 2009 against Sunderland, coming on for Didier Drogba. On 16 September, Sturridge scored a hat-trick in a reserve match against Ipswich Town. On 28 October, he made his first start for the club in a League Cup win against Bolton Wanderers at Stamford Bridge.

On 20 December, Sturridge came on as a substitute at half time against West Ham United and won Chelsea a controversial penalty that Lampard converted. He made his first start in the Premier League for Chelsea away against Birmingham City on Boxing Day and scored his first two goals for Chelsea against Watford in the FA Cup third round on 3 January 2010. Sturridge continued to show his ability with a real poacher's effort in a 2–0 victory in the FA Cup against Preston North End, scoring his third goal for Chelsea in January. On 13 February, he netted again against Cardiff City, as Chelsea won 4–1. Sturridge scored his first League goal for Chelsea on 25 April 2010, in a 7–0 victory over Stoke City at Stamford Bridge, by latching onto a through ball, before rounding goalkeeper Asmir Begović and slotting the ball home. During the 2010 FA Cup Final, he came on as a 90th-minute substitute for Chelsea as they won 1–0 against Portsmouth. Sturridge finished the 2009–10 FA Cup campaign as the leading scorer for Chelsea with four goals.

2010–11 season
On 15 September 2010, Sturridge made his full UEFA Champions League debut against Slovakian team MŠK Žilina. He scored on his debut, his first Champions League tally, in a 4–1 away victory. In the Premier League, in a 1–0 loss to his former club Manchester City, Sturridge came on as a substitute for striker Didier Drogba. He scored his second goal in the Champions League against Žilina, which Chelsea went on to win 2–1 at home. Later that season, he scored two right-footed goals against Ipswich Town.

Loan to Bolton Wanderers
On 31 January 2011, Sturridge agreed to join Bolton Wanderers on a loan deal until the end of the season. He made his debut two days later, coming on as a substitute at home to Wolverhampton Wanderers, scoring his first goal in the process, an injury time winner. He followed this with another goal in the defeat to Tottenham Hotspur the following weekend, in which he made his first start, before scoring his third goal in three matches in the 2–0 victory over Everton. After Sturridge scored the equaliser against Newcastle United in his fourth match, he became only the sixth player to score in his first four matches for a club in the Premier League. Sturridge continued to make an impact at Bolton and finished his loan spell with eight goals in 12 appearances at the club. Having never been booked in his career, Sturridge received his first ever red card in the final match of the season against former club Manchester City.

2011–12 season

Having received a red card in his final match for Bolton, Sturridge was suspended for the first three competitive matches in the 2011–12 season for Chelsea. Despite rumours linking him with a move away on deadline day, Sturridge remained in West London amidst strong support from his manager André Villas-Boas, who said, "He would have been playing if he was not suspended from last season." In his first match back from suspension, at Sunderland, Sturridge started and scored with a back-heel in the 50th minute to put Chelsea up 2–0 in an eventual 2–1 victory. Sturridge returned to the Reebok Stadium on 2 October 2011, scoring twice within the first 30 minutes, the first a header after 90 seconds from a corner and the second a long-shot from outside the box that goalkeeper Ádám Bogdán erred in saving. Sturridge also provided an assist to Frank Lampard's goal in the 15th minute of the match, which eventually ended 5–1. On 15 October 2011, Sturrdge scored against Everton in a 3–1 win, giving him four league goals in four matches. He then came on as a substitute in the League Cup match against Everton on the 90th-minute, in which he scored a 116th-minute winner, which saw Chelsea win 2–1 in extra time to put them in the last eight.

Sturridge scored his seventh goal in the Premier League season in a 3–0 victory for Chelsea against Newcastle. On 13 December, during the fixture against Sturridge former club Manchester City at Stamford Bridge, Sturridge provided an assist for a Raul Meireles goal in the 34th minute. The match ended a 2–1 victory, when Frank Lampard scored a late penalty after Joleon Lescott handled Sturridge's shot in the penalty area. Sturridge scored in the away 1–1 draw against Wigan Athletic; he controlled Ashley Cole's diagonal long ball with his left foot, then scored with his right from a tight angle to give Chelsea the lead in the 59th minute. On 22 December, during Chelsea's away clash with Tottenham, he scored his ninth goal in the 2011–12 domestic season, the equaliser in a 1–1 draw away at White Hart Lane. Sturridge scored his team's first goal in a 4–2 win against Aston Villa. He scored the opener in fantastic style after 45 seconds with his 11th Premier League goal of the season against local rivals Queens Park Rangers on 29 April, which Chelsea ran out 6–1 winners to keep Champions League qualification alive. He was an unused substitute as Chelsea won the 2012 UEFA Champions League Final.

2012–13 season
Sturridge missed all of Chelsea's pre-season matches to begin the 2012–13 campaign, as he was on duty with Great Britain in the 2012 Summer Olympics. He did, however, play against Manchester City in the 2012 FA Community Shield, assisting Ryan Bertrand's goal, by shooting and Costel Pantilimon spilling it. Sturridge missed the first 2012–13 UEFA Champions League group stage matches against Juventus and Nordsjælland and the first League Cup match against Wolverhampton. He also missed the Premier League match against Stoke City with a hamstring injury. He scored the last Premier League goal for the club in the 4–2 win against Tottenham at White Hart Lane after coming on as a late substitute and scoring from Juan Mata's cross in stoppage time to seal victory. His last goal for Chelsea was against Manchester United in the League Cup, scoring in extra time in the 5–4 win. After Blues manager Roberto Di Matteo was sacked as manager and replaced by Rafael Benítez, Sturridge was never to play for the club again due to injury.

Liverpool

2012–13 season
On 2 January 2013, Sturridge completed a move from Chelsea to Liverpool, signing a long-term contract for an undisclosed fee thought to be in the region of £12 million. He made his debut on 6 January against Mansfield Town in the FA Cup third round, scoring his first Liverpool goal after just seven minutes in a match which Liverpool won 2–1. He scored on his league debut after coming on as a half-time substitute the following weekend, scoring in a 2–1 defeat against rivals and league leaders Manchester United at Old Trafford on 13 January. Sturridge scored his third goal for Liverpool in his first league start and home debut for the club, a 5–0 win against Norwich City at Anfield on 19 January. With the goal, he had scored three goals in his first three appearances for the club, becoming the first Liverpool player since Ray Kennedy in 1974 to accomplish the feat, despite not yet playing a full 90 minutes for the club.

On 3 February, Sturridge scored a goal from 25 yards-out against former club Manchester City in a 2–2 draw at the City of Manchester Stadium. Sturridge continued this run of form on 17 February, with an assist for teammate José Enrique, as well as scoring a penalty against Swansea City in a 5–0 win, having missed the prior two matches due to a combination of ineligibility and injury. He also scored against former club Chelsea in a 2–2 draw at Anfield, the match of teammate Luis Suárez's biting incident with Blues defender Branislav Ivanović, which led to a ten-match ban for Suárez. Sturridge scored two goals and notched an assist in a 6–0 win over Newcastle United on 27 April at St James' Park. On 12 May, he scored his first career hat-trick, in a 3–1 win against Fulham at Craven Cottage.

2013–14 season

Sturridge began the 2013–14 season by scoring the first goal of the season – which also turned out to be the only goal in Liverpool's 1–0 win over Stoke City – with a shot from outside the box. He then followed this up with a goal against Aston Villa in another 1–0 win and a brace against Notts County in the League Cup, taking his season's tally to four goals in three matches. He continued his fine form by scoring the only goal in a 1–0 win against fierce rivals and defending champions Manchester United on his 24th birthday at Anfield, and giving a man of the match performance in a 3–1 win away at Sunderland by scoring and providing two assists for Luis Suárez. These performances earned Sturridge the season's first Premier League Player of the Month award for the month of August. On 23 November, he came off the bench to score a last-minute equaliser against Everton in a thrilling Merseyside derby that finished 3–3.

Sturridge's impressive goal-scoring form continued into the new year, with Sturridge becoming the first Liverpool player in the Premier League era to score in seven consecutive league matches when he found the net at Craven Cottage against Fulham. He went on to become only the second player in Premier League history to score eight matches in a row after a brace against Swansea City in a 4–3 home win. He was then named Player of the Month for the second time in the season for February, scoring five goals and earned two assists during the month.

On 18 April, Sturridge was named as one of the six players on the shortlist for the PFA Players' Player of the Year award and was also nominated for the PFA Young Player of the Year award. On 27 April, he was named alongside teammates Steven Gerrard and Luis Suárez in the PFA Team of the Year. Sturridge's haul of 21 league goals made him the runner-up in the season's Premier League Golden Boot, behind strike partner Suárez.

2014–15 season
Sturridge started the 2014–15 season scoring a late winner in Liverpool's opening match, a 2–1 win over Southampton. While on international duty in September 2014, Sturridge incurred a thigh injury and forced out of action for up to three weeks. On 11 September, manager Brendan Rodgers publicly criticised England's handling of Sturridge, stating his injury "could have been preventable." Despite rumours, England manager Roy Hodgson rejected talk of a rift between him and Rodgers over Sturridge's injury.

Sturridge was ruled out for another three more weeks after suffering a calf strain injury during training on 17 October. On 18 November, he broke down in training with a new thigh injury which saw him miss the next six weeks.

After missing close to five months, Sturridge made his return to the team on 31 January in a 2–0 win over West Ham as a 68th-minute substitute for Lazar Marković, scoring in the 87th minute after a through ball from Philippe Coutinho. On 4 March, Sturridge scored the second goal in a 2–0 win over Burnley.

Sturridge's injury-plagued season continued when he picked up a hip injury on 22 March in a 2–1 loss to rivals Manchester United, despite scoring Liverpool's lone goal. On 5 May, he underwent a successful hip operation in the United States that ruled him out until September, meaning he would miss the start of the new season.

2015–16 season
After missing the first five matches of Liverpool's Premier League campaign due to injury, Sturridge made his first appearance of the season against Norwich City on 20 September 2015. He scored his first two goals of the season in a 3–2 victory against Aston Villa on 26 September. On 15 October, Sturridge suffered a knee injury in training that would rule him out another four weeks.

On 2 December, he scored a brace in a 6–1 away win over Southampton in the quarter-final of the League Cup. Four days later he suffered another hamstring injury in a 2–0 defeat to Newcastle United, that ruled him out for two months. He returned to the team on 14 February 2016, scoring in a 6–0 win over Aston Villa at Villa Park. 14 days later, he started in the 2016 League Cup Final loss to Manchester City, playing the full 120 minutes as Liverpool were defeated in a penalty shoot-out.

On 10 March 2016, he scored his first Europa League goal for Liverpool in a 2–0 win over rivals Manchester United at Anfield. He scored his 50th goal for Liverpool in all competitions on 20 April, in a 4–0 win at home in the Merseyside derby; he is the fourth fastest Liverpool player to reach that landmark, doing so in 87 appearances.

On 5 May 2016, Sturridge scored his 12th goal of the season in Liverpool's 3–0 win over Villarreal in the Europa League semi-final second leg to qualify the team for the 2016 UEFA Europa League Final. On 19 May, Sturridge scored the opening goal of the Europa League Final, an eventual 3–1 loss to Sevilla in Basel. Sturridge ended the season as Liverpool's top scorer with 13 goals.

2016–17 season
Sturridge began the season as an understudy to Roberto Firmino and generally came off the bench during the second half in league matches. On 23 August, Sturridge started the match against Burton Albion in the EFL Cup and scored a brace in the 5–0 win for Liverpool. Sturridge started in the fourth round of the EFL Cup against Tottenham on 25 October and scored a brace in a 2–1 win for Liverpool at Anfield. He scored his first league goal of the season on 27 December, scoring within one minute of coming on as a second-half substitute against Stoke. Sturridge's goal, Liverpool's fourth on the night and 86th for the year, saw the club break its record for goals scored in a calendar year.

2017–18 season
On 27 August 2017, Sturridge scored in a 4–0 win over Arsenal, just three minutes after coming on as a substitute. On 28 October, he scored the opening goal in a 3–0 win over Huddersfield Town. On 1 November, he scored in a 3–0 win over Maribor in the UEFA Champions League.

Loan to West Bromwich Albion
On 29 January 2018, Sturridge joined West Bromwich Albion on loan for the remainder of the 2017–18 season. On 12 February, in just his third appearance for West Brom since joining on loan, Sturridge suffered a hamstring injury after three minutes of playing in a 3–0 away defeat to Chelsea.

2018–19 season
Back in Liverpool colours, on 12 August 2018, Sturridge scored with his first touch after 24 seconds coming on as a substitute in a 4–0 win over West Ham United. On 18 September, he scored the opening goal of a 3–2 win over Paris Saint-Germain in the opening match of the UEFA Champions League. On 26 September, he scored the opening goal against his former club Chelsea in the EFL Cup third round, though Liverpool eventually lost the match 1–2. Three days later Sturridge scored the equalising goal – and 50th league goal of his Liverpool career – with a 25-yard curler in the 89th minute to earn a 1–1 draw with Chelsea at Stamford Bridge, which was later voted as Premier League Goal of the Month for September.

Despite not playing in the 2019 UEFA Champions League Final against Tottenham Hotspur on 1 June 2019, Sturridge picked up his second Champions League winner's medal and became the first Englishman to win the competition with two different English clubs. Three days later, he and Alberto Moreno were both released by Liverpool.

On 18 July 2019, Sturridge was banned from football for six weeks, four of which were suspended, for breaching betting rules after instructing his brother to bet on a possible move to Sevilla.

Trabzonspor
Sturridge signed for Turkish Süper Lig club Trabzonspor on 21 August 2019 on a three-year contract. On 2 March 2020, Sturridge was released from the club after having his contract mutually terminated; he had scored seven goals in sixteen games. The same day he received a four-month worldwide ban for breaching betting rules (see previous section); an appeal board also fined him £150,000.

Perth Glory 
On 1 October 2021, Australian side Perth Glory announced the signing of Sturridge for the A-League 2021–22 season. Perth chairman and owner Tony Sage described the signing as one of the biggest in A-League history, while Sturridge said he hadn't joined the club for "a holiday". He only began training with his new team in mid-November due to fitness struggles, and said he could not put a timeframe on how long it would take to return to full fitness.

On 20 November 2021, Sturridge made his debut for Perth Glory coming on as an 84th minute substitute against Adelaide United. A near-capacity crowd of 17,198 turned up at Perth Oval to see Sturridge make his first appearance. On 23 February 2022, Sturridge suffered a groin injury having come on as a substitute during a 1–0 defeat to Macarthur, and was subbed off after 18 minutes of game time. Perth's chief executive Tony Pignata admitted the move hadn't worked, describing it as "disappointing". On 3 June, it was announced that he had been released by new manager Ruben Zadkovich, having started just one game, scoring 0 goals in six appearances.

International career

Youth

Sturridge has represented England at U16, U17, U18, U19, U20 and U21 levels; he had also been eligible to represent Jamaica through his father. He scored twice against the Netherlands for the under-18 team in 2007, netting again in the Under-19 European Championships against the Netherlands. He scored the only goal for England U21 in a 1–1 draw against Greece U-21 in Greece and scored his second U-21 goal in the 1–0 win over Portugal.

He was named in the England under-21 squad for the 2011 UEFA European Under-21 Championship. England was eliminated in the group stages. Sturridge was selected to the team of the tournament.

Senior
On 6 November 2011, Sturridge was handed his maiden England call-up by being named in the England squad for the friendlies against Spain and Sweden, after excelling for Chelsea. He was an unused substitute in a 1–0 victory against Spain, but Fabio Capello insisted that Sturridge would play against Sweden the following Tuesday and did, as he made his debut coming on as a second-half substitute for Theo Walcott. He made his second appearance against the Netherlands coming on in the first half for the injured Steven Gerrard and caused the Dutch defence problems throughout the match and earned the man of the match award for his efforts during the match.

He scored his first senior goal for England in his fifth match on 22 March 2013, after coming on for Wayne Rooney in an 8–0 away win against San Marino in World Cup qualification. The goal meant he had made an appearance and scored for all levels of international football for England, from U16 to the seniors, as well as scoring for the Great Britain Olympic football team. On 11 October, he scored another goal in England's qualification campaign, an injury-time penalty in a 4–1 win over Montenegro after he had been fouled by Ivan Kecojević. He scored again in the opening match of 2014, England's March friendly with Denmark. The score was 0–0 until the eighty-second minute, when Sturridge rose to head an Adam Lallana cross into the net for a late winner.

2012 Summer Olympics
On 2 July 2012, Sturridge was named in Stuart Pearce's 18-man squad for the Great Britain Olympic football team to compete at the 2012 Summer Olympics. It was however, announced on 3 July 2012 that Sturridge was undergoing tests for suspected meningitis, and was possibly going to be unable to compete in the GB 2012 team. However, he made a full recovery meaning he could take part and he scored his first goal for Great Britain in the second group match, a 3–1 victory over the United Arab Emirates. In the final group match, Sturridge scored the only goal as Great Britain defeated Uruguay to finish top of their group and progress to the quarter-final. In the quarter-final match against South Korea, Sturridge missed the fifth penalty for Great Britain. South Korea then scored theirs, knocking out Team GB.

2014 FIFA World Cup
In May 2014, Sturridge was named in England's squad for the 2014 FIFA World Cup and assigned the number 9 shirt. He scored the team's opening goal in a 3–0 friendly victory over Peru at Wembley Stadium on 30 May.

On 14 June, Sturridge started England's opening match of the tournament and scored the team's goal in a 2–1 defeat by Italy in Manaus.

UEFA Euro 2016
Despite injury keeping him out of most of the UEFA Euro 2016 qualification phase, Sturridge was named in England's squad for the UEFA Euro 2016 finals. In the team's second group match, after appearing as a half time substitute against Wales, Sturridge assisted Jamie Vardy's equaliser and scored the winning goal as the team recovered from a 1–0 deficit.

Style of play

Former Chelsea manager André Villas-Boas said, "Daniel offers a few of the characteristics I had with Hulk when I was with him in Porto... He is an extremely quick player, and he has technique at pace."

Sturridge said he preferred to play as a centre-forward rather than as a wide player: "I do still see myself as a striker but I am doing a job for the team and I'm enjoying doing it." As Sturridge transitioned from a wider role into a striker when he joined Liverpool, Sturridge also said that he likens himself on striker Thierry Henry, who "played wide for Juventus and then went to Arsenal and played as a centre-forward."

Although he rarely played for Chelsea as a striker, Liverpool manager Brendan Rodgers played Sturridge as a striker in most matches. His ability to still drop between lines and pull wide and attack defences, similar to former strike partner Luis Suárez's playing-style, has led to Rodgers describing him as "what I call a 'nine-and-a-half".

Outside of football

Personal life
Sturridge is the son of former footballer Mike Sturridge, and the nephew of former footballers Dean and Simon Sturridge. Sturridge used to support Derby County when he was younger because his uncle, Dean, played for them. But once Dean left, Sturridge switched his allegiance to Arsenal.

Sturridge is a Christian. After winning the Premier League Player of the Month award, Sturridge said, "I do all [through] Christ who strengthens me." He is actively involved in charity work, often helping young players get involved in football. In November 2012, while playing for Chelsea, he presented a cheque for €50,000 on behalf of Hyundai to Street League, a charity dedicated to helping disadvantaged players across Europe get into football. In June 2013 he presented a further cheque of £50,000 to Street League, whilst visiting their new centre in Liverpool. Later that same month, Sturridge opened his charity foundation named after him in Portmore, Jamaica, with its aim to help youngsters there get into sport and entertainment. He also owns the Sturr Class Entertainment record company. Sturridge is of Jamaican descent, all of his grandparents being Jamaican.

In 2019, Sturridge's home in Los Angeles was broken into, and his Pomeranian dog, Lucci, was lost. On Twitter he offered a reward for the dog's return. Shortly after, Foster Washington of Los Angeles claimed to have found the dog and returned him to Sturridge. In March 2021 Washington filed suit against Sturridge and on December 22, 2021, was awarded $30,000 in damages. In response Sturridge claimed that another person found and returned the dog and was rewarded for doing so.

Endorsements
Sturridge has an endorsement deal with sportswear and equipment supplier Nike. He wears Nike Hypervenom boots. He is an ambassador for BT Sport. Sturridge is featured in EA Sports' FIFA video game series, and his signature jig goal celebration appears in FIFA 14. Prior to the 2014 FIFA World Cup, Sturridge featured in a series of adverts in the UK promoting fast food restaurant Subway.

Career statistics

Club

International

As of match played 8 October 2017. England score listed first, score column indicates score after each Sturridge goal.

Honours
Chelsea

 UEFA Champions League: 2011–12
 Premier League: 2009–10
FA Cup: 2009–10, 2011–12

Liverpool
UEFA Champions League: 2018–19
Football League Cup runner-up: 2015–16
UEFA Europa League runner-up: 2015–16

Individual
PFA Team of the Year: 2013–14 Premier League
UEFA European Under-21 Championship Team of the Tournament: 2011
Premier League Player of the Month: August 2013, February 2014
Premier League Goal of the Month: September 2018

References

External links

1989 births
Living people
Footballers from Birmingham, West Midlands
English footballers
England youth international footballers
England under-21 international footballers
England international footballers
Association football forwards
Aston Villa F.C. players
Coventry City F.C. players
Manchester City F.C. players
Chelsea F.C. players
Bolton Wanderers F.C. players
Liverpool F.C. players
West Bromwich Albion F.C. players
Trabzonspor footballers
Perth Glory FC players
Premier League players
Süper Lig players
FA Cup Final players
UEFA Champions League winning players
2014 FIFA World Cup players
UEFA Euro 2016 players
Olympic footballers of Great Britain
Footballers at the 2012 Summer Olympics
English expatriate footballers
Expatriate footballers in Turkey
English expatriate sportspeople in Turkey
Black British sportsmen
English Christians
English people of Jamaican descent
Daniel
Sportspeople involved in betting scandals
Expatriate soccer players in Australia
English expatriate sportspeople in Australia